Ojante (English: Unknowingly) is a Bangladeshi film released in 1996, directed by Bengali director Dilip Biswas. The film was remade into Bengali India in 1998 as Aamar Maa and which was directed by same director. The screenplay is written by Komol Sarkar based on family drama.

Cast
 Alamgir – Mirja Shahriar
 Shabana - Kajal
 Sohel Rana - Asad
 Suchorita - Asha
 Riaz  – Mirza Ashik
 Sonia

Awards

Actor Sohel Rana won the Bangladesh National Film Award for Best Actor.

Sources

External links
 

1996 films
1996 drama films
Bengali-language Bangladeshi films
Bangladeshi drama films
Films scored by Satya Saha
1990s Bengali-language films